Kemal Demirsüren (1930 – 27 March 2005) was a Turkish wrestler. He competed in the men's Greco-Roman bantamweight at the 1952 Summer Olympics.

References

External links
 

1930 births
2005 deaths
Turkish male sport wrestlers
Olympic wrestlers of Turkey
Wrestlers at the 1952 Summer Olympics
Place of birth missing